Come Around is the debut studio album from Minneapolis, Minnesota pop rock band Sing It Loud. It was released on Epitaph Records on September 23, 2008. The band toured with Valencia in August and September 2008, prior to their own headlining tour, and then a supporting slot for Cobra Starship until November 2008. On April 21, 2009, a music video was released for "Don't Save Me". Between June and August 2009, the band appeared on the Warped Tour.

Track listing 
All tracks by Sing it Loud

 "I've Got a Feeling" - 2:54
 "We're Not Afraid" (feat. Justin Pierre) - 2:57
 "Come Around" - 3:22
 "Don't Save Me" - 3:31
 "Give it Up" - 3:13
 "MPLS" - 3:13
 "No One Can Touch Us" (feat. Alex Gaskarth) - 3:15
 "Marionettes" - 3:47
 "Over You" - 3:23
 "Fade Away" - 2:45
 "Best Beating Heart" - 3:47

Notes 
 The band's previous drummer, Dane Schmidt, plays drums and sings backup vocals on this album. He was replaced by Chris "Sick Boy" Lee several months after the album was recorded.

Credits 
 Pat Brown – lead vocals, guitar
 Kieren Smith – lead guitar, background vocals
 Nate Flynn – bass guitar
 Ben Peterson – keyboards
 Chris "Sick Boy" Lee – drums

Additional credits 
 Ed Ackerson - Engineer
 Joshua Cain - Producer
 Mark Trombino - Mixing
 Eli Janney - Engineer
 Dane Schmidt - Drums, background vocals
 UE Nastasi - Mastering
 Eric Gorvin - Song Writer (No One Can Touch Us)
 Claudio Rivera - Drums
 Peter Anderson - Percussion, Assistant Engineer
 Alex Gaskarth - Additional Vocals
 Justin Pierre - Additional Vocals

References 

2008 debut albums
Sing It Loud albums
Epitaph Records albums